The Day I Turned to Glass is Honeycut's debut full-length album. Released on September 26, 2006, the album contains twelve tracks spanning roughly 45 minutes.

The album is noted for having a track used twice in Apple's promo materials: Exodus Honey was first featured in a commercial for the newly redesigned aluminum iMac in summer 2007, and later that year in the welcome video that plays on first launch of Mac OS X Leopard (the same video made its way to Snow Leopard in 2009, after which Apple stopped including intro videos in its operating systems).

Track listing
The Day I Turned to Glass - 3:39
Tough Kid - 3:23
Shadows - 3:38
Butter Room - 4:46
Dysfunctional - 4:04
Dark Days, White Lines - 3:38
Polaroid Lullaby - 1:43
Silky - 4:13
Aluminum City - 2:05
Crowded Avenue - 4:58
Exodus Honey - 4:22
Fallen to Greed - 4:11

References

2006 albums
Quannum Projects albums